Jonathan Grayer is the Chairman and CEO of Imagine Learning, a leading digital education technology company focused on developing digital curriculum and tools for pre-K–12 students. Grayer founded the company in January 2010 as a partnership with Kohlberg Kravis Roberts (KKR). In January 2018, the company announced a new strategic partnership with Silver Lake Partners. Grayer previously served as the Chairman and CEO of Kaplan, Inc., a global education company and test prep provider that has been owned by Graham Holdings Company (formerly the Washington Post Company) since 1984.  Grayer, named CEO in 1994, grew Kaplan's revenues from $80 million to $2.3 billion when he retired from the company in 2008.

Education and Kaplan
Grayer graduated with a B.A. from Harvard College in 1986 and an M.B.A. from Harvard Business School.  Over the course of his college career, he served as a summer intern in the corporate development department at The Washington Post Company.  Upon completing his M.B.A. at Harvard Business School in 1990, he joined the marketing department of Newsweek, another Washington Post company, where he was eventually named the director of marketing. Grayer joined Kaplan in 1990 as regional operations director, and held several titles before becoming president and CEO in July 1994. He was named Chairman and CEO of the education company in February 2002.(The Washingtonian, June 2005)

When Grayer first became CEO of Kaplan in 1994, the company was an $80 million test preparation business.  Through a series of strategic acquisitions that brought Kaplan into the higher education and professional training markets, he was able to diversify Kaplan into a company that provides lifelong learning and had more than $2 billion in revenue in 2007.

In 2004, BusinessWeek named Grayer one of the best managers of the year for his leadership in establishing Kaplan as The Washington Post Company’s "financial crown jewel". The company’s growth under his leadership has been reported on by other national and international media including Fortune, Forbes, The Wall Street Journal and the Financial Times.  On November 19, 2008, Grayer announced his resignation from Kaplan, stating that he plans to pursue "entrepreneurial activity, investment and philanthropy".

Weld North
Grayer founded Weld North in 2010 in partnership with KKR to invest in education, health and wellness, media, marketing and consumer services companies. Since its founding, Weld North has made over 30 investments in growth stage companies.

Imagine Learning 
In the K-12 industry segment, Weld North operates its platform Imagine Learning:

Edgenuity, an Arizona-based 6th-12th grade educational technology and curriculum company, which was acquired in July 2011;
Compass Learning, a Texas-based digital curriculum company, acquired in July 2016;
Glynlyon, an Arizona-based provider of digital curriculum, acquired in March 2019;
LearnZillion, a Washington, D.C.-based provider of digital core curriculum, acquired in December 2019;
Purpose Prep, a Michigan-based provider of Social Emotional Learning curriculum, acquired in June 2020;
Imagine Learning, a Utah-based English language learning company, which was acquired in April 2014;
Assessment Technology, Inc., an Arizona-based educational measurement market leader in K-12 online assessment;
BookheadEd Learning, a California-based developer of engaging and effective digital-first curriculum, including the award-winning StudySync, a comprehensive English Language Arts (ELA) program for grades 6-12, acquired in December 2020;
Twig Education, a UK-based provider of high-quality science curriculum products designed to improve science literacy globally, acquired in July 2021. Twig’s flagship product, Twig Science Next Gen, is a highly engaging, multimedia-rich, digital-first Science program, grounded in the Next Generation Science Standards (NGSS);
Robotify, an Ireland-based provider of engaging coding and virtual robotics curriculum, acquired in November 2021.;

In January 2018, Weld North announced it had sold KKR's stake in Weld North Education to Silver Lake Partners. In February 2021, Onex agreed to make a significant investment in Weld North Education.

Other investments 

 In February 2018, Weld North sold its investment in Performance Matters, a Utah-based K-12 data analytics company, to PeopleAdmin, a Vista Equity Partners portfolio company.  
 In November 2018, Weld North sold The Learning House, a Kentucky-based service provider to over 100 higher education institutions, to John Wiley & Sons. 
 In January 2016, Weld North acquired a controlling interest in Boston based learning analytics company Intellify Learning. 
 Weld North is also an investor in Relationship Science and Voxy.

Grayer is a frequent speaker on education reform, investing, and innovation.

Other roles

Grayer serves on the board of Memorial Sloan-Kettering Cancer Center. In September 2005, he was named by U.S. Secretary of Education Margaret Spellings to the Commission on the Future of Higher Education.

In June 2016, The Kaplan Educational Foundation honored Grayer with the 2016 Leadership Award in recognition of his role as founder of the foundation when he was CEO of Kaplan, Inc. The Kaplan Educational Foundation, founded in 2006, helps disadvantaged black and Latino community college students complete their associate degrees and transfer to top U.S. colleges and universities.

Grayer Family Foundation 

In 2019, Grayer launched The Grayer Family Foundation to target three areas of need: to provide financial support for cancer care and research, to increase access to higher education for under resourced students, and to create more nutritional options for underprivileged kids before and after school.

References

American chief executives of education-related organizations
Harvard Business School alumni
Living people
Harvard College alumni
1964 births